The discography of Prodigy, an American rapper and one half of the hip hop duo Mobb Deep, consists of 6 studio albums, 3 collaborative albums, 1 EP, 5 mixtapes and 17 singles.

Albums

Studio albums

Collaborative albums

EPs

Compilation albums

Mixtapes

Singles

As lead artist

As featured artist

Guest appearances

References

Discographies of American artists
Hip hop discographies